Center for Eurasian Studies (AVİM) was founded on 2 January  2009.

History

The Center for Eurasian Strategic Studies (ASAM) which was established at the end of the 1990s in Ankara ceased its operations in 2008. Institute for Armenian Research (Ermeni Araştırmaları Enstitüsü)  (ERAREN), a sub-working group of ASAM, continued its studies for a while. In 2009, ERAREN decided to carry out its activities as Center for Eurasian Studies (AVİM) within the Turkmeneli Cooperation and Culture Foundation in Ankara. After establishment of AVİM, in addition to the main field of study of ERAREN, AVİM has expanded its field of study by making studies on the Eurasian Region.

Research
Studies at AVİM are carried out by 12 research assistants. The Center focuses on the following regions and main themes, with researchers, analysts and visiting research assistants continuing their master's and doctoral degrees/doctorate:

Regions
 Central Asia
 Balkans 
 Caucasus 
 Wider Black Sea Region   
 Europe
 Baltic Region

Research Areas
 Turkish-Armenian Relations
 Xenophobia and Racism
 Turkey–European Union relations
 International Security

Advisory board

 Çınar Aldemir (R. Ambassador)
 Ertuğrul Apakan (R. Ambassador)
 Prof. Dr. Edward J. Erickson (Historian)
 Prof. Dr. Michael M. Gunter (Historian)
 Prof. Dr. Justin McCarthy (University of Louisville)
 Dr. Ayten Mustafayeva (Azerbaycan İlimler Akademisi, İnsan Hakları Enstitüsü)
 Jeremy Salt (Bilkent Üniversity)
 Prof. Dr. Hakan Yavuz (Utah University)

Academic Board
 Prof. Dr. Seçil KARAL Akgün
 Prof. Dr. Hüseyin Bağcı (Middle East Technical University)
 Prof. Dr. Sadi Çaycı (Başkent University)
 Prof. Dr. Kemal Çiçek
 Prof. Dr. Temuçin Faik Ertan (Türk İnkılap Tarihi Enstitü Müdürü)
 Prof. Dr. Hikmet Özdemir (Cumhurbaşkanlığı Eski Başdanışmanı)
 Prof. Dr. Hüseyin Pazarcı
 Dr. Bilal Şimşir (R. Ambassador, Historian)
 Dr. Pulat Tacar (R. Ambassador) 
 Prof. Dr. Ömer Turan (Middle East Technical University)

Publications 
Center for Eurasian Studies publishes four journals. International Crimes and History (bilingual), Review of Armenian Studies (English) and Ermeni Araştırmaları (Turkish) are peer-reviewed and indexed journals. Eurasian World is a semi-academic (bilingual) journal.

References

Think tanks established in 2009
Think tanks based in Turkey